Luis Cream (born December 2, 1982) is an American professional boxer managed by Chuck Diesel. Diesel Fit Boxing Professional Sports Management and Consultant Services group  out of Philadelphia, Pennsylvania. He is the grandson of the former World Heavyweight boxing champion Jersey Joe Walcott.

Professional career
Cream's fight weight has been at 145 1/2 to 147 1/2 pounds, considerably less than his famous grandfather Jersey Joe Walcott who debuted at 158 pounds and reached a high of 201 pounds during his heavyweight fighting prime. Cream had a four round unanimous decision over Miguel Corcino at Bally's Atlantic City on February 25, 2012.

References

External links
 

Boxers from New Jersey
Sportspeople from Camden, New Jersey
Living people
1982 births
Welterweight boxers
American male boxers